Pennsylvania Western University, Clarion, also known as PennWest Clarion, is a public university campus in Clarion, Pennsylvania. Part of the Pennsylvania State System of Higher Education (PASSHE), the institution was founded in 1867 and offers associate, bachelor's, and master's degrees, as well as certificate programs and a Doctor of Nursing Practice.

History
In 2021, PASSHE announced that, due to budget troubles resulting from declining enrollment and revenue, Clarion University would merge with Edinboro University of Pennsylvania and California University of Pennsylvania. On October 14, 2021, the state officially adopted the new name of the combined universities: Pennsylvania Western University, and began operations with a singular accreditation the following year.

Student body
In fall 2016, Clarion University's student body totaled 5,225 students, of which 4,330 were undergraduates and 895 of those were graduate students. Of these students, 35 percent live in university housing. The university's students are mostly female (66 percent), another 830 are minorities (16 percent) and 27 are international (.05 percent). Of the total number of students 4,624, or 88.5 percent, come from the commonwealth of Pennsylvania. Students come from 44 states, the District of Columbia and 11 countries around the world.

Faculty and staff
Clarion University has 294 faculty members and 451 administration and staff members.

Other locations
The university maintains a regional campus, Clarion University - Venango in Oil City, and a site in Pittsburgh at West Penn School of Nursing. 
Clarion also offers an extended studies program featuring online courses, remote sites, and various hybrid learning situations.

Academics

PennWest Clarion offers 175 degree and certificate programs through its three colleges and two schools, delivered on campus and online.

Student groups
Clarion University offers more than 130 student organizations including academic, athletic, Greek, political, multicultural, service, and other special interest groups.

Athletics

The PennWest Clarion Department of Athletics, which maintains the institution's pre-merger athletic branding as "Clarion", currently sponsors men's intercollegiate baseball, basketball, golf, football, swimming and diving, and wrestling along with women's intercollegiate basketball, softball, cross country, golf, soccer, swimming and diving, track and field, volleyball and tennis. All sports compete in the NCAA Division II, except for wrestling which participates in NCAA Division I. The athletic director is Dr. Wendy Snodgrass.

Notable former Golden Eagles include wrestling great Kurt Angle, a former Olympic gold medalist and national champion who went on to a successful professional wrestling career in WWE and Impact Wrestling; former UFC Champion Frankie Edgar, who was a four-time NCAA Division I tournament qualifier; World Long Driver Justin Moose ranked # 6 in the world; Reggie Wells, NFL offensive lineman; Cy Young winner Pete Vuckovich; and Hall of Fame basketball coach John Calipari, who was a point guard for the Golden Eagles from 1980 to 1982.

Notable alumni
 Kurt Angle, 1996 Summer Olympics wrestling gold medalist, professional wrestler, and member of the WWE and Impact Wrestling Halls of Fame.
John Calipari, NBA and college basketball coach, currently at the University of Kentucky (2009–present)
Guy Conti, New York Mets pitching rehab coordinator
Adam Earnheardt, academic and author
Frank Edgar (1981–), 4-time D-1 NCAA Wrestling qualifier and Collegiate Freestyle All-American in 2004; professional mixed martial artist/UFC fighter and former UFC Lightweight Champion.
 Joan Marie Engel, Rear Admiral with the Navy Nurse Corps (1994–1998)
Evan John Jones (1872–1952), U.S. Congressman from Pennsylvania (1919–1923)
Joe Kapp, radio producer, Cook and Poni Show, KDKA-FM
Rad Martinez, mixed martial arts fighter for Bellator Fighting Championships and featured on ESPN's Outside the Lines
Mike Miller, Arizona Cardinals Offensive Coordinator from (2011-2012)
Ruth Bermudez Montenegro, United States federal judge for the Southern District of California
Justin Moose, Golfer (Long Drive)
 Donna Oberlander, Pennsylvania state representative (R-63)
Larry Richert, host of the KDKA Morning News
Wade Schalles, all-time record holder for most pins and most wins in amateur wrestling, inventor of the spladle and cement mixer
Randall Silvis, author
Peter Talleri, Major General, United States Marine Corps (1979-2013)
Pete Vuckovich, former professional baseball player and 1982 A.L. Cy Young Award winner
Reggie Wells, San Diego Chargers offensive lineman
Dan Wilson, biologist and science communicator

References

External links
 
 Clarion Athletics website

 
Educational institutions established in 1867
Universities and colleges in Clarion County, Pennsylvania
Universities and colleges in Venango County, Pennsylvania
1867 establishments in Pennsylvania
Public universities and colleges in Pennsylvania